Nafi, also known as Sirak, is an Austronesian language of Morobe Province, Papua New Guinea.

It is spoken in the single village of Nambom (also known as Banzain village) in Gamiki ward, Wain-Erap Rural LLG. Ethnic Nafi people living in Popof village have since switched to speaking Nakama, a Trans-New Guinea language. Intermarriages frequently occur between the two villages.

References

Markham languages
Languages of Morobe Province